La mujer de mi vida is an upcoming American Telenovela that will air on Telemundo. It is an original story created by Mario Schajris, with Miguel Varoni as executive producer. The first preview of the series was shown on Telemundo on 21 July 2022. It will star Angélica Celaya, Iván Sánchez, Catherine Siachoque and Mauricio Islas.

Plot 
The series revolves around Ricardo Oribe (Iván Sánchez), a physically unattractive but successful businessman, dedicated to his family and in love with his beautiful wife Daniela (Angélica Celaya), a young aspiring actress. Ricardo's life takes a turn when his best friend Emilio (Mauricio Islas) betrays him and tries to kill him in order to take over his company and the family he never had. Despite being presumed dead by his family and friends, Ricardo is still alive, but suffering from amnesia. After a course of 15 years, Ricardo goes through several physical changes and recovers his memory.

Ready to recover everything that belongs to him, he assumes a new identity as Pablo Silva to avoid falling into the hands of the authorities for the bad move Emilio planned. Determined to win back the love of his life, he returns to reconnect with his wife, children and friends without being recognized. However, he must be careful because if he is found out, he could ruin his life and the lives of his loved ones.

Cast 
A confirmed cast list was released on 7 October 2021, on the NBCUniversal Media Village´s newsroom page.
 Iván Sánchez as Ricardo Oribe / Pablo Silva
 Angélica Celaya as Daniela Millan
 Mauricio Islas as Emilio García Fuentes
 Catherine Siachoque as Marcela Jiménez Mello
 Patricia Reyes Spíndola as Antonia Oribe
 David Ostrosky
 Rodrigo Murray as Pedro Magnetti
 Norma Angélica as Nina López
 Vanessa Díaz as Juana Oribe Millan
 Jason Romo as Dante Oribe Millan
 Cris Amado as child Dante
 Rosalinda Rodríguez as Sharon González
 Oswaldo Zárate as Juan Manuel Ávila
 Felipe Betancourt as Andrés Rósales
 Litzy as Carmen Alonso
 Pepé Gamez
 Ana Lorena Sánchez
 Norkys Batista as Evelyn del Río
 Simone Marval as Luciana Aguilera
 Vin Ramos
 Katia Bada

Production 
Production of the series began shooting on 17 September 2021. On 7 October 2022, the cast photo shoot and official press conference were held at the Telemundo Center studios. The production wrapped shooting on 15 January 2022 on location in Miami, Florida. The series was presented on 16 May 2022, as part of Telemundo's Up-front for the 2022-23 television season.

References 

Upcoming television series